Guðmundur Hólmar Jónsson (born April 28, 1979 in Akureyri) is a  javelin thrower from Iceland. He won the 2010 European Team Championships, Third League, in javelin throw. Jónsson also became the Icelandic Champion in javelin throw in 2009 and 2010.

Achievements

Personal best 
 Javelin throw - 74.05 (2010)

External links 

Gudmundur Holmar Jonsson
Living people
1979 births